World Vegan Day is an annual event celebrated by vegans around the world every 1 November. The benefits of veganism for animals, humans and the natural environment are celebrated through activities such as setting up stalls, hosting potlucks, and planting memorial trees. The event was established in 1994 by Louise Wallis, then Chair of The Vegan Society in the United Kingdom, to commemorate the 50th anniversary of the founding of the organisation and the coining of the terms "vegan" and "veganism". Speaking in 2011, Louise Wallis said: "We knew the Society had been founded in November 1944 but didn’t know the exact date, so I decided to go for 1 November, partly because I liked the idea of this date coinciding with Samhain/Halloween and the Day of the Dead – traditional times for feasting and celebration, both apt and auspicious."

Europe

Germany 
 World Vegan Day, Germany. Several different events in the metropolitan cities.

North America

United States

Boston, Massachusetts 
 Annual Boston Vegetarian Food Festival (all weekend), free vegan food (many thousands of attenders), sponsored annually and currently by the Boston Vegetarian Society.

Oceania

Australia

Adelaide 
 Adelaide celebrates World Vegan Day every year on a Sunday in November. The first Vegan Festival was held on 4 November 2007. The event is possible because of many individual volunteers and members of various organizations. Kas Ward created the Vegan Festival in Adelaide and is the main event coordinator.
 M.A.D. FREE Weekend in Adelaide celebrates World Vegan Day in November. 13–15 November 2009.

Melbourne 
Since 2003 World Vegan Day has been celebrated in Melbourne on the last Sunday of October. The event was initiated by members of the vegan social group Vegans Unite and is now organized by a committee affiliated with Vegetarian Victoria. Stalls include Lentil as Anything, Invita Living Foods, Animals Australia, Aduki Independent Press, Eco-shout Melbourne, Vegan Society of Australia, ALV, the Melbourne University Food Co-op, Lush Australia and eco store.

Sydney 
The Winery by Gazebo in Surry Hills will hold Sydney's first annual event on the first Sunday of November, being Sunday 6th in 2016.

New Zealand

Invercargill 
 Invercargill Vegan Society in Invercargill, New Zealand, has celebrated World Vegan Day since 2011. The world's southernmost vegan group, for World Vegan Day 2012 they gave away tofu to butchers, placed posters around their city, gave away vegan muffins in the city centre and held a group potluck dinner. World Vegan Day 2013 celebrations included visits to butchers' shops and vegan baking and soya milk giveaways in the city centre. Vegan activists were included on the CUE TV's news bulletin and gave a soft toy dog to an animal-skin-preserving factory. A potluck dinner was held at Invercargill public library as the sun set on World Vegan Day 2013.

Calendar context 
World Vegan Day, a.k.a. International Vegan Day, is celebrated in continuity with Vegetarian Awareness Month (all of October, which begins with World Vegetarian Day on October 1, and includes other commemorative dates involving reverence for life in all species, faith-based vegetarianism and animal advocacy, and more. World Vegan Day follows Vegetarian Awareness Month (October) and initiates World Vegan Month (all of November). November 2, commemorated as Dynamic Harmlessness Day, is the birthday of the late H. Jay Dinshah, founder of the American Vegan Society.

See also 
 List of food days
 List of vegetarian festivals
 Meat-free days
 November 1
 World Vegetarian Day
 Veganuary
 Vegan school meal
 List of vegan restaurants
 Meatless Mondays

References

External links 
 

1944 introductions
Annual events
International observances
November observances
Observances about food and drink
Veganism
Veganism in the United Kingdom
November events
Autumn events